Paint Creek is a stream in Bourbon County, Kansas, in the United States.

Paint Creek was named from the fact Native Americans used ochre in this creek as body paint.

See also
List of rivers of Kansas

References

Rivers of Bourbon County, Kansas
Rivers of Kansas